The 1996 San Marino Grand Prix was a Formula One motor race held on 5 May 1996 at the Autodromo Enzo e Dino Ferrari, Imola, Emilia-Romagna, Italy. It was the fifth round of the 1996 Formula One season. The 63-lap race was won by Damon Hill driving for the Williams team after starting from second position. Michael Schumacher finished second driving a Ferrari, despite his front-right brake seizing halfway around the final lap, with Gerhard Berger third driving for the Benetton team. Jacques Villeneuve retired near the end of the race after being hit by Jean Alesi.

Classification

Qualifying

Race

Championship standings after the race

Drivers' Championship standings

Constructors' Championship standings

 Note: Only the top five positions are included for both sets of standings.

References

San Marino Grand Prix
San Marino Grand Prix
San Marino Grand Prix
San Marino Grand Prix